This is a list of lighthouses in Canada.  These may naturally be divided into lighthouses on the Pacific coast, on the Arctic Ocean, in the Hudson Bay watershed, on the Labrador Sea and Gulf of St. Lawrence, in the St. Lawrence River watershed (including the Great Lakes), and on the Atlantic seaboard.

British Columbia

Active Pass Lighthouse
Addenbroke Island Lightstation
Amphitrite Point Lighthouse
Boat Bluff lighthouse
Bonilla Island Lightstation
Brockton Point Lightstation
Cape Beale Lightstation
Cape Mudge Lighthouse
Cape Scott Lighthouse
Carmanah Point Light Station
Chatham Point lighthouse
Chrome Island Lightstation
Discovery Island Light
Dryad Point Lighthouse
Egg Island Lightstation
Entrance Island Lightstation
Estevan Point Lighthouse
Fisgard Lighthouse, the oldest lighthouse on the West Coast of Canada.
Gallows Point Light
Green Island Lightstation
Holland Rock Lightstation
Ivory Island Lightstation
Kains Island Lightstation
Langara Light
Lennard Island Lightstation
Lucy Island Lighthouse
Nootka Lighthouse
Ogden Point Breakwater Lighthouse
Pachena Point Lighthouse
Pine Island Lightstation
Point Atkinson Lighthouse 
Pointer Island Lightstation
Race Rocks Lighthouse, the second oldest lighthouse on the West Coast of Canada.
Roberts Bank Light
Sands Head Light
Scarlett Point Lighthouse
Sheringham Point Lighthouse
Sisters Island Lightstation
Trial Islands Lighthouse
Triple Island Lightstation
Triangle Island Lightstation

Sources:

Manitoba

Newfoundland and Labrador

Labrador

This is a list of lighthouses in Labrador.

Newfoundland Atlantic Coast
This is a list of lighthouses on Newfoundland's Atlantic Coast.

Newfoundland South Coast
This is a list of lighthouses in Newfoundland South Coast.

Newfoundland West Coast

This is a list of lighthouses in Newfoundland West Coast.

New Brunswick

Anderson Hollow
Bayswater
Belyea's Point
Cape Enrage
Cape Spencer Light
Cocagne
Dixon Point
Gannet Rock
Grand Harbour Lighthouse
Green's Point
Head Harbour
Inch Arran
Jerome Point
Lighthouse on the Green
Long Eddy Point
Machias Seal Island
Miscou Island Lighthouse
Mulholland Point
Oak Point
Old Portage Island
Point-du-Chene
Pointe-Sapin
Quaco Head
Richiboucto Head
Southwest Head
Swallowtail Lighthouse
Sources:

Nova Scotia
Balache Point Lighthouse
Bass River, lighthouse, in use from 1908 to the 1980s
Devils Island Light
Cape Forchu Lighthouse
Cape George Point Lighthouse, located in Antigonish County
Cape North Lighthouse, in use from 1908 to 1980
Cape Sable Lighthouse, located on Cape Sable Island
Caribou Island Lighthouse (Nova Scotia), located in Pictou County
Five Islands, lighthouse, in use from 1914 to 1993
Fort Point Lighthouse
Georges Island Lighthouse
Grandique Point Lighthouse
Hampton Beach Lighthouse, located overlooking Chute's Cove, Hampton Beach. Established 1911.
Jerome Point Lighthouse, located in St. Peter's, Cape Breton. Established in 1882
Kidston Island Lighthouse
Louisbourg Light, built on the site of the oldest lighthouse on the continent, and the first Canadian one
Low Point Lighthouse
Neil's Harbour Lighthouse
Peggys Point Lighthouse
Peter Island lighthouse
Point Prim Lighthouse, located at the entrance of the Digby Gut
Sambro Island Lighthouse, the oldest continuously operating lighthouse in North America
Sable Island East End Light
Sable Island West End Light
The Salvages Light Tower
Schafner Point Lighthouse
Seal Island Lighthouse
St. Paul Island Lighthouses North point and South point

Sources:

Ontario

Beausoleil Island Light
Big Tub Light, Tobermory, Ontario 
Brebeuf Island Light
Burlington Canal Front Range Light 
Burlington Canal Rear Range Light 
Byng Inlet Range Lights
Cabot Head Light
Cape Croker Lighthouse
Caribou Island Lighthouse
Chantry Island Lightstation Tower Lightstation, Chantry Island, Ontario 
Christian Island Light
Coppermine Point
Cove Island Light 
Erieau East Pier Light
Fleet Street Lighthouse in Toronto, aka Queen's Wharf
Gibraltar Point Lighthouse on the Toronto Islands
Ile Parisienne Light, Whitefish Bay, Lake Superior
Imperial Towers Six stone lighthouses built circa 1858-59, on Lake Huron and Georgian Bay
Kincardine Lighthouse, Kincardine, Ontario
Long Point Lighthouse, Long Point, Ontario (built in 1917, is the third Long Point Light, replaced the 1843 light, which in turn replaced the 1830 light)
Mohawk Island Light, on Mohawk Island, Ontario (formerly called Gull Island)
Nottawasaga Island Lighthouse Nottawasaga Island, Collingwood, Ontario
Nine Mile Point on Simcoe Island 
Old Cut Lighthouse on Long Point (inactive)
Snug Harbour, Parry Sound, Killbear Provincial Park
Point Clark Lighthouse, Point Clark, Ontario
Prescott Breakwater Light in Prescott, Ontario 
Prince Edward Point in Prince Edward County, Ontario 
Queen's Wharf, see Fleet Street Lighthouse
Thames River Light
Toronto Harbour Light at Tommy Thompson Park in Toronto
Windmill Point Light (best known because of the Battle of the Windmill) 
Port Burwell Lighthouse, Port Burwell- Canada's oldest wooden lighthouse
 Presqu'ile Lighthouse

Sources:

Prince Edward Island

Quebec
Pointe-Mitis Lighthouse, Métis-sur-mer, built in 1909
Cap de la tête au chien Lighthouse, Saint-Siméon
Cap-au-Saumon Lighthouse, Port-au-Persil, built in 1894
Haut-fond Prince Lighthouse, offshore Tadoussac, built in 1964
Pointe-au-Père lighthouse, in use from 1908 to 1975
Cap-des-Rosiers, the tallest lighthouse in Canada: 34.1 M
Île-Verte Lighthouse, built in 1809, third oldest in Canada
Brandy Pot Lighthouse, Rivière-du-Loup, built in 1862
Bicquette Island Lighthouse, Le Bic, built in 1843
Matane Lighthouse, Matane
Cap Chat Lighthouse, Cap Chat, built in 1871
La Martre Lighthouse, La Martre, built in 1906
Cap Madeleine Lighthouse, Gaspé Peninsula
Fame Point Lighthouse, Gaspé, built in 1880
Cap Gaspé Lighthouse, Forillon National Park
Cap Blanc Lighthouse, Percé
Cap-d’Espoir, Chaleur Bay
Étang-du-Nord Lighthouse, built in 1874, rebuilt in 1987, Cap-aux-Meules
Amherst Island Lighthouse, built in 1960, Amherst Island
Brion Island Lighthouse, Brion Island, built in 1905
Lachine Light Tower, Lachine, built in 1900
L'ile du Moine Lighthouse, Sorel
Ile Sainte-Hélène Light, Montréal, Quebec, built in 1912
Soulanges Canal Lower Entrance Front Range Light, Pointe-des-Cascades, built in 1902, inactive since 1960
Courbe Maskinongé Lighthouse, Offshore Lac Saint-Pierre
Pilier de pierre Lighthouse, Saint-Jean-Port-Joli built in 1843
Pointe de la Prairie Lighthouse, Isle-aux-Coudres, built in 1971
Port Daniel Ouest Lighthouse, Port-Daniel–Gascons, built in 1919

See also
 History of lighthouses in Canada
 List of lighthouses and lightvessels
 Lightvessel
 Lighthouses in the United States

References

External links

OurOntario.ca images of lighthouses
 

 
 
Lighthouses